Yeronga State High School (YSHS) is a co-educational state secondary school located in Yeronga, Queensland, Australia,  away from the Brisbane central business district. As of August  2021, Yeronga State High School had an enrolment of 776 students; of which, many were born overseas. As of 2017, only 27% of students enrolled at Yeronga State High School were born in Australia.

History 
Yeronga State High School was opened on 25 January 1960, with 217 students and 12 staff members. Enrolment peaked at 1,821 students in 1971: after which, enrolment declined due to the opening of Acacia Ridge State High School and Holland Park State High School, which both opened in 1971. Enrolment has since consistently remained at around ~770 students.

Principals

The following principals have led the school since it was opened:

Mr W Kemp; 1960 
Mr F T Barrell; 1961-1970
Mr N J Corfield; 1971-1983
Mr I K Smith; 1984-1987
Mr B G Tracey; 1988-2000
Mrs V N Hadgelias; 2001-2003
Mr A D Jones; 2004-2007
Mr Terry Heath; 2007-2021
Mr Timothy Barraud; 2022-present

Notable alumni

Students 
Mabior Chol - Australian rules football player
Bryan Law - Australian activist
Thelma Plum - musician
Mojgan Shamsalipoor - refugee

Faculty 
Ian Dorricott - Composer

See also
Education in Australia
Lists of schools in Queensland

References 

Public high schools in Queensland
Yeronga, Queensland
Educational institutions established in 1960
1960 establishments in Australia